The Mayor of Ahmedabad, a city in the Indian state of Gujarat,Rishabh Magarwadia is the leader of the elected wing of Ahmedabad Municipal Corporation. He is elected for a term of 2.5 years and eligible for reappointment. The term of mayor is also reserved for members of Scheduled Caste and women representatives. The first mayor was appointed on 1 July 1950.

The Mayoral office of Ahmedabad has seen various prominent personalities like Sardar Vallabhbhai Patel, who later became first Deputy Prime Minister of India. Aniza Begum Mirza was the first women mayor of a Muslim community in India.

List of Mayors of Ahmedabad 

Following is the list of Mayors:

References 

Mayors of places in Gujarat
Ahmedabad